Catherine Dunnette (born May 14, 1980) is a Canadian fencer. She competed in the individual épée event at the 2004 Summer Olympics.

References

External links
 

1980 births
Living people
Canadian female épée fencers
Olympic fencers of Canada
Fencers at the 2004 Summer Olympics
Sportspeople from Calgary
Pan American Games medalists in fencing
Pan American Games bronze medalists for Canada
Fencers at the 2003 Pan American Games
Medalists at the 2003 Pan American Games
21st-century Canadian women